Pete Sampras was the defending champion but lost in the final 6–4, 6–4 against Lleyton Hewitt.

Seeds
The top eight seeds received a bye to the second round.

  Andre Agassi (third round, retired)
  Pete Sampras (final)
  Magnus Norman (withdrew)
  Cédric Pioline (quarterfinals)
  Thomas Enqvist (second round)
  Lleyton Hewitt (champion)
  Marat Safin (quarterfinals)
  Tim Henman (second round)
  Greg Rusedski (third round)
  Todd Martin (second round)
  Mark Philippoussis (second round)
  Andrei Pavel (quarterfinals)
  Fabrice Santoro (second round)
  Sébastien Grosjean (second round)
  Marc Rosset (first round, retired)
  Andrew Ilie (first round)

Draw

Finals

Top half

Section 1

Section 2

Bottom half

Section 3

Section 4

Notes

External links 
 2000 Stella Artois Championships draw

Singles